The Aga Khan Academy, Nairobi is a private, co-educational not-for-profit school situated in the Parklands neighborhood of Nairobi, Kenya. The school was established in 1970. The academy became an IB World School on 12 November 1999.

IB curriculum 
Primary Years Programme (PYP) is designed for students between 3 and 12 years of age which is the nursery and junior section of the academy. The PYP is guided by six trans-disciplinary themes that are knowledge and skills across and beyond subject areas.

The Middle Years Programme (MYP) is for students aged 11 to 16 years is a five-year programme designed to encourage students to make practical connections between their studies and the real world. Students who complete this programme are prepared to undertake the IB Diploma Programme. Subject groups providing a broad education for early adolescents.

Aga Khan Academy through the International Baccalaureate provides several STEM-related resources for educators in the MYP. The curriculum focuses on STEM as a perspective from which to consider integrated teaching and learning in concepts and skills related to science, technology, engineering and mathematics about the STEM education.

The Diploma Programme (DP) is offered for students aged 16 to 19 years, this programme aims to develop students who have a great breadth and depth of knowledge. The DP curriculum is made up of six subject groups and the DP core comprising theory of knowledge creativity, activity, service and the extended essay. It is made up of 3 required components.

Student life 
Each year students in the junior school participate in various events displaying their skills and talents within the Arts: visual arts, drama and music.

The senior school offers a diverse range of sports such as netball, basketball, soccer, rounders, swimming and hockey as well as a student leadership program. This program is a structured design to develop leadership competence in their senior year.

See also

 Aga Khan Development Network
 Aga Khan Junior Academy, Nairobi
 Education in Kenya
 List of international schools

References

External links

1970 establishments in Kenya
Nairobi
Educational institutions established in 1970
International Baccalaureate schools in Kenya
Schools in Nairobi
High schools and secondary schools in Kenya
Private schools in Kenya